Kellgren is a surname. Notable people with the surname include:

Christer Kellgren (born 1958), Swedish ice hockey player
Gary Kellgren (1939–1977), American audio engineer
George Kellgren (born 1943), Swedish firearms designer
Jessica Kellgren-Fozard, English YouTuber
Johan Henric Kellgren (1751–1795), Swedish poet and critic
Katherine Kellgren, American narrator